The Slitheen Excursion is a BBC Books original novel written by Simon Guerrier and based on the long-running British science fiction television series Doctor Who. It features the Tenth Doctor initially without a companion, most likely following on from the fourth series finale Journey's End. During the story he does acquire a temporary companion in the form of university student June who—while still with him at the end of the story—does not appear in any other adventure. It was released on 2 April 2009, alongside Judgement of the Judoon and Prisoner of the Daleks.

Audiobook
An unabridged audiobook was released in May 2010 on download only, read by Debbie Chazen.

See also
Whoniverse

References

External links
The Cloister Library - The Slitheen Excursion

2009 British novels
2009 science fiction novels
New Series Adventures
Tenth Doctor novels
Novels about ancient astronauts
Classical mythology in popular culture
Slitheen novels